Wozdwizhenskaya Fortress (1742) on the Sakmara River was the second fort built as a part of Sakmara Distance by Ivan Neplyuyev during his governance of the Orenburg Commission. It was built for protection against raids by nomadic Kyrgyz tribes for capturing of slaves from the Russian frontiers on the Caspian Sea and slave trading to Khiva.

The Wozdwizhenskaya Cossacks supported the Imperial government during the Pugachev's Rebellion in 1773–1775. The Fortress was completely destroyed by the bombardment of the Red Guards units in May 1918 for supporting the counterrevolution of Alexander Dutov against the Soviet authorities.

References

Forts in Russia